The Summerland Steam are a Canadian Junior "B" ice hockey team based in Summerland, British Columbia. They are a member of the Bill Ohlhausen Division in the Okanagan/Shushwap Division of the Kootenay International Junior Hockey League and play their homes games at Summerland Arena.

History
The Summerland Steam were founded in 2011, and began play in the 2011-12 season in the Okanagan Division of the KIJHL. The town of Summerland previously had a franchise in the KIJHL, called the Summerland Sting, which relocated to Penticton for the 2009-10 KIJHL season, only two seasons before the Steam were founded. In the 1980s, the town was home to the Summerland Buckaroos, a Junior A team in the British Columbia Hockey League. The Buckaroos only lasted five seasons due to continuous losing records. In the Steam's first season, they missed the playoffs, finishing with a record of 15-35-0-2 and 32 points in 52 games, 24 points behind 4th place Kelowna. In their second season, the Steam qualified for the playoffs with a 21-28-1-2 record. They fell, 4-2, to the Kelowna Chiefs in the first round, losing four straight after winning the first two games of the series in Kelowna. In 2013-14, the Steam won the Okanagan Division, winning their last seven games and pulling ahead of Kelowna in the final few games of the regular reason. They were, however, upset in the first round of the divisional playoffs by North Okanagan. In 2014-15, the Steam finished second in the Okanagan Division, with a record of 28-19-2-3. They defeated the rival Chiefs in the first round, advancing to the division final. They lost, narrowly, to the division champion Osoyoos Coyotes. 12 players returned for the Steam for the 2015-16 season. Despite their recent conception, the Steam hold intense rivalries with all of their fellow Okanagan Division teams, most notably the Kelowna Chiefs and Osoyoos Coyotes. They were also fierce geographic rivals with the Penticton Lakers for a few seasons, before the forced relocation of the Lakers to 100 Mile House. The Steam finished the 2015-16 KIJHL season with a record of 34-16-0-0-2, 2nd in the Okanagan Division behind the Osoyoos Coyotes. In the first round of the playoffs, the Steam defeated the Kelowna Chiefs 4-2 in a violent series, the second straight year the Steam have done so. They then defeated the regular-season division champions Osoyoos Coyotes in the second round, advancing to play the 100 Mile House Wranglers in the conference finals. The Wranglers would defeat the Steam 4-1, including a controversial Game 4 overtime winner. On August 10, 2016, the Steam named defenceman Alex Williams as team captain. The Steam finished the 2016-17 season with a record of 34-9-1-3, and defeated Kelowna in the first round, in seven games, before being swept by the Osoyoos Coyotes in the second round.

Origins of the team name

The Steam's name was taken from the famous Kettle Valley Steam Railway, the only remaining line of the trans-provincial Kettle Valley Railway, which runs through Summerland, and is a popular tourist destination in the town. The steam engine is pictured in the team's logo.

Season-by-season record

Note: GP = Games played, W = Wins, L = Losses, T = Ties, OTL = Overtime Losses, Pts = Points, GF = Goals for, GA = Goals against

Records as of February 27, 2023.

Playoffs

Records as of February 27, 2023.

Current roster

Accurate as of 2016-17 season.

Team staff
GENERAL MANAGER/COACH - Mark MacMillam

ASST COACH  Gus Cave

TRAINER - Dan Mcdowell

Awards and trophies

Most Sportsmanlike
Steve Semenoff: 2011-12 (Divisional)

Rookie of the Year
Kienan Scott: 2013-14

See also

 List of ice hockey teams in British Columbia
 Summerland Sting

References

External links
Official website of the Summerland Steam

Ice hockey teams in British Columbia
2011 establishments in British Columbia
Ice hockey clubs established in 2011